Amazing Grace is a live album by American singer Aretha Franklin. It was recorded in January 1972 at the New Temple Missionary Baptist Church in Los Angeles, with Reverend James Cleveland and the Southern California Community Choir accompanying Franklin in performance. The recording was originally released as a double album on June 1, 1972, by Atlantic Records.

The album was a critical and commercial success, selling over two million copies in the United States alone and earning a double platinum certification. It also won Franklin the 1973 Grammy Award for Best Soul Gospel Performance. As of 2017, it stands as the best-selling disc of Franklin's entire fifty-plus year recording career as well as the highest-selling live gospel music album of all time.

Amazing Grace was remastered and re-released in 1999 as a two-compact disc set with many previously unreleased takes. A film documenting the making of the album premiered in 2018.

Critical reception

Reviewing for Rolling Stone in 1972, Jon Landau commented: "Amazing Grace is more a great Aretha Franklin album than a great gospel album. She plays havoc with the traditional styles but she sings 'like never before' on record. The liberation and abandon she has always implied in her greatest moments are now fully and consistently achieved." Landau found himself "struck first by the comprehensiveness and depth of the arrangement and then by the brilliance of her lead voice," hailing her performance as "a virtuoso display of gospel pyrotechnics, done with control and imagination." He was especially fond of the uptempo songs expressing "unqualified joy," saying they "hit with tremendous power."

Robert Christgau was less enthusiastic about the album, later writing in Christgau's Record Guide: Rock Albums of the Seventies (1981): "Because I don't think God's grace is amazing or believe that Jesus Christ is his son, I find it hard to relate to gospel groups as seminal as the Swan Silvertones and the Dixie Hummingbirds and have even more trouble with James Cleveland's institutional choral style. There's a purity and a passion to this church-recorded double-LP that I've missed in Aretha, but I still find that the subdued rhythm section and pervasive call-and-response conveys more aimlessness than inspiration. Or maybe I just trust her gift of faith more readily when it's transposed to the secular realm."

In another retrospective review, Ron Wynn of AllMusic regarded Amazing Grace as possibly Franklin's "greatest release ever in any style" and said, "Her voice was chilling, making it seem as if God and the angels were conducting a service alongside Franklin, Rev. James Cleveland, the Southern California Community Choir, and everyone else in attendance. Her versions of 'How I Got Over' and 'You've Got a Friend' are legendary."

Rolling Stone ranked the album number 154 on the 2020 reboot of their 'The 500 Greatest Albums of All Time' list.

Track listing

1972 double LP

Note
Adeline M. Brunner is also known as Herman Lubinsky.

Amazing Grace: The Complete Recordings 
Information is based on this edition's liner notes

Disc 1 (Thursday Night Show - 1/13/72)
Organ Introduction (On Our Way) - Performed by Kenneth Lupper
Opening Remarks - Performed by Rev. James Cleveland
On Our Way - Performed by Southern California Community Choir
Aretha's Introduction - Performed by Rev. James Cleveland
Wholy Holy
You'll Never Walk Alone
What a Friend We Have in Jesus
Precious Memories - Featuring Rev. James Cleveland
How I Got Over
Precious Lord (Take My Hand)/You've Got a Friend
Climbing Higher Mountains
Amazing Grace
My Sweet Lord (Instrumental)
Give Yourself to Jesus

Disc 2 (Friday Night Show - 1/14/72)
Organ Introduction (On Our Way)/Opening Remarks Performed by Ken Lupper and Rev. James Cleveland
On Our Way - Performed by Southern California Community Choir
Aretha's Introduction - Performed by Rev. James Cleveland
What a Friend We Have in Jesus
Wholy Holy
Climbing Higher Mountains
God Will Take Care of You
Old Landmark
Mary Don't You Weep
Never Grow Old
Remarks by Rev. C.L. Franklin - Featuring Rev. James Cleveland
Precious Memories - Featuring Rev. James Cleveland
My Sweet Lord (Instrumental)

Note
Unless otherwise indicated, all tracks (except for "Remarks by Rev. C.L. Franklin") are performed by Aretha Franklin.

Documentary 

Amazing Grace, a documentary/concert film directed by Sydney Pollack for Warner Bros., was set to be released as part of a double bill with Super Fly in 1972. However, Pollack was unable to complete the film because he had not used a clapperboard to synchronize the picture and sound at the beginning of each take. The film ended up in the studio vaults for over 38 years. Before Pollack's death in 2008, he turned the footage over to producer Alan Elliott, who after two years succeeded in synchronizing the picture and sound and completing the film.

Elliott first planned to release the film in 2011, but was prevented from doing so when Franklin sued him for using her likeness without permission. However, Franklin's original contract for the film was later discovered at Warner Bros., and Elliott planned to show the film at the Telluride Film Festival, Toronto International Film Festival, and Chicago International Film Festival in 2015. Franklin once again sued and was granted an emergency injunction against the Telluride screening, saying she had not given permission to screen the footage. Franklin issued a statement saying, "Justice, respect and what is right prevailed and one's right to own their own self-image." Due to the ongoing litigation, the film was then removed from the schedules of both the Chicago and Toronto festivals as well.

The film premiered on November 12, 2018, three months after Franklin's death.

Personnel
Unless otherwise indicated, information is based on the album's liner notes:

Musicians
Aretha Franklin – piano (D5, D7, celesta on B6), lead vocals
Rev. James Cleveland – piano (A1-B5, B7, C1-C4, D6-D7), lead vocals (C1)
Cornell Dupree – guitar
Rev. C.L. Franklin - vocals (C3)
Kenneth "Ken" Lupper – organ, additional keyboards 
Pancho Morales – congas, additional percussion 
Bernard Purdie – drums
Chuck Rainey – bass
Southern California Community Choir – background vocals

Production
Aretha Franklin - producer, musical arrangements
Rev. James Cleveland - choir director
Jimmy Douglass - assistant recording engineer 
Rev. Alexander Hamilton - assistant choir director 
Wally Heider - recording engineer 
Arif Mardin - producer, remixing, music editing 
Gene Paul - assistant recording engineer 
George Piros - assistant recording engineer 
Ray Thompson - recording engineer 
Jerry Wexler - producer

Charts

Certifications

References

External links

1972 live albums
Albums produced by Arif Mardin
Albums produced by Jerry Wexler
Aretha Franklin live albums
Atlantic Records live albums
Grammy Hall of Fame Award recipients
Live gospel albums